Alfred Roth (4 October 1890 – 5 September 1966) was a French footballer. He played in one for the France national football team in 1920.

References

External links
 

1890 births
1966 deaths
French footballers
France international footballers
Place of birth missing
Association football defenders
Footballers at the 1920 Summer Olympics
Olympic footballers of France